Pleiospilos compactus, called living rock, is a species of flowering plant in the ice plant genus Pleiospilos, native to the southwestern Cape Provinces of South Africa. A succulent, it has gained the Royal Horticultural Society's Award of Garden Merit.

Subtaxa
The following subspecies are currently accepted:
Pleiospilos compactus subsp. canus (Haw.) H.Hartmann & Liede
Pleiospilos compactus subsp. fergusoniae (L.Bolus) H.Hartmann & Liede
Pleiospilos compactus subsp. minor (L.Bolus) H.Hartmann & Liede
Pleiospilos compactus subsp. sororius (N.E.Br.) H.Hartmann & Liede

References

compactus
Flora of the Cape Provinces
Endemic flora of South Africa
Plants described in 1927